IFL Super League (Indonesian: Liga Super Futsal Indonesia) is the official main competition for professional futsal clubs in Indonesia. It is organized by PSSI (Football Association of Indonesia).

Participating clubs in 2011

Electric PLN (Jakarta)
Pelindo II (Jakarta)
Limus IBM Jaya (West Java)
Futsal Kota Bandung (West Java)
Jatim Futsal (Surabaya)
Bank Sumut FC (North Sumatra)
Harimau Rawa (Riau)
Sriwijaya United FC (South Sumatra)
JICT Jakarta (Jakarta)
Jaya Kencana United (South Tangerang)
Green House Solo (Central Java)
* = It is a club that comes after PT. Sriwijaya Optimistic Mandiri (parent company of the ISL club Sriwijaya FC) to purchase a license from the club Isen Mulang (Central Kalimantan).

References

External links
Official Website

Futsal leagues in Indonesia
2006 establishments in Indonesia
Futsal

id:Liga Futsal Indonesia